Dendrolasma mirabile is a species of harvestman in the family Nemastomatidae. It is found in North America.

References

External links

 

Harvestmen
Articles created by Qbugbot
Animals described in 1894
Taxa named by Nathan Banks